Ricardo Acuña and Luke Jensen were the defending champions but did not compete that year.

Ricardo Acioly and Dacio Campos won in the final 7–6, 7–6 against César Kist and Mauro Menezes.

Seeds
Champion seeds are indicated in bold text while text in italics indicates the round in which those seeds were eliminated.

 Todd Witsken /  Jaime Yzaga (quarterfinals)
 Ricardo Acioly /  Dacio Campos (champions)
 Luiz Mattar /  Cássio Motta (semifinals)
 Ivan Kley /  Fernando Roese (first round)

Draw

External links
 1989 Guarujá Open Doubles Draw

1989 Grand Prix (tennis)